This is a list of parks in British Columbia including national, provincial, municipal, and regional parks.

Provincial parks

City and municipal parks
 Beacon Hill Park (Victoria)
 Beecher Park (Burnaby)
 Central Park (Burnaby)
 Cloverdale Fairgrounds (Surrey)
 Como Lake Park (Coquitlam)
 Deer Lake (Burnaby)
 Douglas Park (Langley)
 Dr. Sun Yat-Sen Classical Chinese Garden (Vancouver)
 Forests for the World (Prince George)
 Falaise Park (Vancouver)
 Fraser River Heritage Park (Mission)
 Hastings Park (Vancouver)
 Hillcrest Park (Vancouver)
 Hinge Park (Vancouver)
 Kensington Park (Burnaby)
 Lighthouse Park (West Vancouver)
 Lynn Canyon Park (District of North Vancouver)
 McAuley Park (Vancouver)
 Minoru Park (Richmond)
 Mystic Vale (University of Victoria, Oak Bay)
 Oppenheimer Park (Vancouver)
 Mundy Park (Coquitlam)
 Paddlewheel Park (Prince George)
 Robert Burnaby Park (Burnaby)
 Queen Elizabeth Park (Vancouver)
 Riverside Park (Kamloops)
 Rocky Point Park (Port Moody)
 Stanley Park (Vancouver)
 Sunrise Park (Vancouver)
 Terra Nova Adventure Park (Richmond)
 Thetis Lake (Saanich)
 Thunderbird Park (Victoria)
 Town Centre Park (Coquitlam)
 Vanier Park (Vancouver)
 Victory Square (Vancouver)
 Wendy Poole Park (Vancouver)

Regional parks
 Belcarra Regional Park (Belcarra, Indian Arm)
 Burnaby Lake Regional Park (Burnaby)
 Capilano River Regional Park (North/West Vancouver)
 Cascade Falls Regional Park (NE of Mission, FVRD Electoral Area "F")
 Coats Marsh Regional Park (Gabriola Island)
 Derby Reach Regional Park (Langley)
 Descanso Bay Regional Park (Gabriola Island) 
 Elk/Beaver Lake Regional Park (Saanich)
 Island View Beach (Central Saanich)
 Kanaka Creek Regional Park (Maple Ridge)
 Minnekhada Regional Park (Port Coquitlam)
 Mount Benson Regional Park (Nanaimo)
 Nanaimo River Regional Park (Nanaimo) 
 Pacific Spirit Regional Park (UEL/Vancouver)
 Sooke Potholes Regional Park (Sooke)
 Surrey Bend Regional Park (Surrey)

References

Parks
British Columbia